The 1955–56 Segunda División season was the 25th since its establishment and was played between 10 September 1955 and 22 April 1956.

Overview before the season
32 teams joined the league, including two relegated from the 1954–55 La Liga and 4 promoted from the 1954–55 Tercera División.

Relegated from La Liga
Real Santander
Málaga

Promoted from Tercera División
Indauchu
Plus Ultra
Mestalla
Cádiz

Group North

Teams

League table

Results

Top goalscorers

Top goalkeepers

Group South

Teams

League table

Results

Top goalscorers

Top goalkeepers

Promotion playoffs

League table

Results

Relegation playoffs

First leg

Second leg

Tiebreaker

External links
BDFútbol

Segunda División seasons
2
Spain